Shepshed Dynamo Football Club is an English football club based in the small town of Shepshed in the north west of Leicestershire, England. Founded as  Shepshed Albion towards the end of the 19th century, the team played for the majority of their early history in the Leicestershire Senior League before a series of league wins and promotions the late 1970s and early 1980s, when they were known as  Shepshed Charterhouse, took them within two promotions of The Football League. The club encountered financial difficulties in 1994 and reformed under the new name in recognition of the help provided by local side Loughborough Dynamo.

History

Early years
Football emerged in Shepshed in the late 19th century and records exist of a violent encounter between the Albion club and Loughborough Corinthians in 1899, but it was not until 1907 that the club joined the Leicestershire Senior League (LSL). Albion had almost immediate success, winning the League in 1911 and again in 1921. They remained in the Leicestershire Senior League for the next 60 years, being promoted and relegated between its two divisions numerous times.

1975–1992: The Charterhouse years
Having been taken over and given significant financial backing by Maurice Clayton, the founder and managing director of Charterhouse Holdings plc, the club became Shepshed Charterhouse in the summer of 1975. The club won the LSL Second Division in 1977–78 following that immediately with three successive LSL First Division titles in 1978–79, 1979–80 and 1980–81, and were admitted to the Midland League for the first time in 1981.

Charterhouse won the Midland League title at the first attempt and when this league merged with the Yorkshire League to form the Northern Counties East League (NCEL) in 1982, they were placed in the NCEL Premier Division. They won their sixth successive league title to earn promotion to the Southern Football League Midland Division for the 1983–84 season. This season also gleaned success in cup competitions, with Charterhouse winning the NCEL Cup as well as successfully negotiating the Qualifying Rounds of the FA Cup to reach the First Round Proper, where they lost 5–1 to Preston North End at Deepdale on the 20 November 1982.

A fourth successive promotion was secured with a second-place finish in the Southern League Midland Division in 1983–84. It is often erroneously stated that Charterhouse gained seven successive promotions during this period, due perhaps to the club achieving six successive first-place finishes, followed by a second place. However, the non-league pyramid was not as formalised at the time as it has subsequently become, and the club won the LSL Premier Division three seasons running.

Playing in the Southern League Premier Division for the first time, the club were able to secure four safe mid-table finishes, finishing as high as seventh in 1985–86. However, they struggled to replicate that form after being transferred to the Northern Premier League Premier Division in 1988, despite appointing arguably their most famous manager, former Nottingham Forest player Martin O'Neill, in July 1989. O'Neill would only be at the club for a few months before going on to forge a highly successful managerial career with Leicester City and Celtic amongst others. Charterhouse however would find no such success, finishing bottom of the league in 1990–91 and 1991–92 resulting in relegation to the NPL Division One.

Decline and reformation
Following relegation, the club changed their name back to Shepshed Albion in 1992, but a year later they were relegated again, to the Midland Football Combination. Despite their single season in the Combination being relatively successful, finishing fourth in the 22 team league, off-field problems saw the  future of the club in doubt.
With help from local side Loughborough Dynamo the club were able to restructure and chose to signal a new era by adopting the name Shepshed Dynamo. The club were placed in the Midland Football Alliance for the 1994–95 season and performed strongly; finishing the season in fourth.

Brief resurgence
The 1995–96 season started with an impressive 23 game unbeaten start. The club went on to win the league by eight points and were promoted to the Southern League Division One Midland for the 1996–97 season.  Promotion brought its own difficulties and Shepshed were forced to seek financial help from Charnwood Borough Council to complete the necessary improvements to the club's facilities to allow them to take their place in the Southern League.

Their first season back in the Southern League resulted in a safe mid-table position, but it was in the FA Cup that they caused their fans the most excitement. Having seen off Stratford Town, Sandwell Borough, Solihull Borough, Knypersley Victoria and Bromsgrove Rovers, the club visited Carlisle United in the First Round Proper eventually going down 6–0 to the Football League side.

Back in decline
A re-organisation of the Southern League for the start of the 1999–2000 season saw Shepshed moved to Division One West. A poor season spent fighting relegation resulted in a final position of 18th.

Shepshed  finished bottom of the Southern League Division One West in 2003–04. However, due to the expansion of the English Football Conference to three divisions, and the subsequent reorganisation of the National League System Shepshed avoided demotion to a regional division and found themselves placed in the Northern Premier League Division One for the 2004–05 season, now at step eight of the pyramid. Further reorganisation of the lower leagues in 2007 left the club in the new Northern Premier League Division One South.

The 2010–11 season finished with Shepshed in the relegation places. However, they were reprieved from relegation to the Midland Football Alliance at the end of the 2010–11 season due to Rushden and Diamonds being expelled from the Football Conference.

The previous seasons reprieve from relegation did not last long, with the club finishing bottom of the Northern Premier League Division One South in 2012 and therefore being relegated to the United Counties League at step nine of the English football league system, the lowest level of football Shepshed has played at since the non-league system was first formalised in 1979. Following one season in the United Counties, the club was moved into the Midland Football Alliance.
In 2014, the Midland Football Alliance and the Midland Football Combination merged to form the new Midland Football League and Shepshed were placed in the Premier Division of the new league.

League history
From Football Club History Database

 L7 = L6 = Level 6 of the football pyramid; Level 7 of the football pyramid; L8 = Level 8 of the football pyramid; L9 = Level 9 of the football pyramid.
 Seasons spent at Level 6 of the football pyramid: 8
 Seasons spent at Level 7 of the football pyramid: 10
 Seasons spent at Level 8 of the football pyramid: 12
 Seasons spent at Level 9 of the football pyramid: 8
Note: The Non-league system was first formalised in 1979 with the creation of the Alliance Premier League and the recognition of the Northern Premier League, Southern Football League and Isthmian League as direct feeder divisions to the Alliance. It was not until 1982 that these divisions had their own recognised "feeder leagues". Therefore, until entering the Northern Counties East Premier Division in 1982, Shepshed had not been part of the pyramid.

Ground

The club have played their games at the Dovecote, situated on Butthole Lane on the north side of the town, since 1891. The ground is allegedly referenced in the Domesday Book as a sporting facility for the village. It is possible, due to the nature of the name Butthole Lane, that the ground itself was used for the village archery practice. The ground is still owned by the family of former Charterhouse Chairman Maurice Clayton.

Colours and crest

The current first team strip consists of black and white stripes, with black shorts and black socks, and their away colours are yellow shirts, black shorts and yellow socks. The club's crest features a stylised "D" inherited from local side Loughborough Dynamo who were central in their reformation in 1994. Loughborough had in turn taken the name "Dynamo" and the "D" logo from Dynamo Moscow, who had toured the UK in 1945.
Previously, the club crest featured a representation of a dove on a field of black and white. During Maurice Clayton's time in charge, the club were 're-branded' with the nickname 'The Raiders' complete with a crest resembling the Los Angeles Raiders, probably inspired by Charterhouse Holdings' lucrative contract to produce merchandise for the NFL.

Players

Notable players/managers
Below is a list of players/managers who fulfill one or more of the following requirements;
1. Have played/managed in the English Football League or any foreign equivalent (i.e. fully professional league)
2. Have full international caps.
3. Hold a club record.

 Ibrahim Bah
 Dale Belford
 Tristan Benjamin
 Jeff Blockley
 Phil Boyer
 Steve Burke
 Neville Chamberlain
 Sammy Chapman
 Willie Gamble
 Paul Geddes
 Lenny Glover
 Neil Grewcock
 Kevin Hector
 Terry Hennessey (Player/Manager)
 Mick Hollis
 Liam Hurst
 Gary Ingham
 Julian Joachim

 Jon McCarthy
 Ernie Moss
 David Nish
 Martin O'Neill (Manager)
 Levi Porter
 Jon Stevenson
 Steve Powell
 John Ramshaw (Manager)
 Dean Smith
 Ian Storey-Moore (Player/Manager)
 Colin Tartt
 Simon Woodhead
 Frank Wignall (Manager)
 Steve Yates
 Alan Young
 Arthur Chadburn (Manager)

References

External links
 Shepshed Dynamo official website
 Complete records of Shepshed Albion's league positions
 Complete records of Shepshed Charterhouse's league positions
 Complete records of Shepshed Dynamo's league positions

Football clubs in Leicestershire
Leicestershire Senior League
Midland Football League
Northern Counties East Football League
Southern Football League clubs
Northern Premier League clubs
Midland Football Alliance
United Counties League
Football clubs in England
1994 establishments in England
Association football clubs established in 1994
Shepshed